Green Eggs and Ham, also known as Green Eggs and Ham: The Second Serving for its second and final season, is an American animated comedy adventure streaming television series loosely based on the 1960 Dr. Seuss book of the same title for Warner Bros. Animation and Netflix. 

The first season premiered on November 8, 2019 on Netflix. The series has received critical acclaim for its animation, humor, story and voice acting. In December 2019, Netflix ordered a second season, titled Green Eggs and Ham: The Second Serving, which was released on April 8, 2022, and is a loose adaptation of The Butter Battle Book.

Premise
In season one,  Sam-I-Am rescues a rare Chickeraffe from a zoo, saying that he intends to return it to its natural habitat. After he accidentally swaps his briefcase, containing the Chickeraffe, for that of failed inventor Guy-Am-I (The unnamed man in the book), Sam and Guy end up on a road trip adventure with E.B., a girl who wants to adopt the Chickeraffe as a pet, and E.B.'s overprotective mother Michellee, who is also a romantic interest for Guy. The four are pursued by Mr. Hervnick Z. Snerz, a tiny evil poacher and collector, who wants to claim the Chickeraffe (named Mr. Jenkins by E.B.) as a trophy, two mysterious agents called the "BAD GUYS", named McWinkle and Gluntz, and Mr. Snerz's bounty hunter, the Goat (as in the goat that rhymes with "boat" in the book).

In season two, titled The Second Serving, which is a sequel miniseries to season one that takes place one week after Mr. Snerz and the Goat's defeat and Mr. Jenkins' departure in season one, Sam, Guy, and E.B. set off on another adventure to East Flubria to find Sam's mom Pam-I-Am, who reveals that she is stopping the nations of Yookia and Zookia, which are at war with one another as a precious orb-like object (the Moo-Lacka-Moo) is stolen by her. So it is up to Sam, Guy, Pam, E.B., and her new friend Looka to return the Moo-Lacka-Moo and stop the war.

Cast

Main voices
 Michael Douglas as Guy-Am-I, a frustrated failed inventor who is revolted by green eggs and ham, despite never having eaten them. He is Sam's best friend, Michellee's husband and E.B.'s step-father, and Guy, Jr's father. 
 Adam DeVine as Sam-I-Am, a hyperactive, playful, and happy-go-lucky enthusiast of green eggs and ham. He is Guy's best friend and Pam's son. 
 Keegan-Michael Key as the Narrator, the disembodied voice who tells the stories of the show.
 Diane Keaton as Michellee Weebie-Am-I, E.B.'s and Guy Jr.'s overprotective mother and Guy's wife.
 Ilana Glazer as E.B. (Elanabeth) Weebie-Am-I, Michellee's daughter and Guy's step-daughter and, Guy Jr's older maternal half-sister who's plucky and adventurous with a kind heart.

Season 1
 Eddie Izzard as Mr. Snerz, an arrogant businessman who wants to capture Mr. Jenkins.
 Rob Paulsen voices Little Snerz.
 Jeffrey Wright as McWinkle, a deadly serious member of "the BAD GUYS" Despite his gruff persona, he is shown to deeply care for the animals he is assigned to protect (the acronym BAD GUYS ironically stands for "Bureau of Animal Defense Glurfsburg Upper Yipville Section").
 Jillian Bell as Gluntz, McWinkle's optimistic and easily excited rookie partner. She returns in season 2 as a fully realized B.A.D.G.U.Y.S. agent.
 In Season 2, Bell also voices Hayzel, a perky (but also tough-as-nails) Zookian guard, who captures Guy and E.B. and interrogates the two in Season 2, Episode 3.
 John Turturro as The Goat, a brutal bounty hunter goat sent by Mr. Snerz. He speaks with a tough Spanish accent.
 Dee Bradley Baker as the vocal effects of Mr. Jenkins (credited as "Chickeraffe"), an energetic chickeraffe who Guy and Sam protect.
 Baker also does the vocal effects of the Giroosters, Squails, Camelopes and Dolphocudas within the show.
 Fred Tatasciore as Yes-Man, Mr. Snerz's sniveling assistant.
 Tatasciore also voices Jeremy, Hayzel's "Lie Detector" who helps interrogate Guy and E.B. in Season 2, Episode 3.
 Tracy Morgan as Michael (credited as "Fox"), an eccentric fox who is obsessed with green eggs and has a crush on a green chicken named Sandra.
 Daveed Diggs as Squeaky (credited as "Mouse"), an imprisoned mouse who himself is a cross-parody of the character "Jean Valjean" from Les Misérables and Diggs' own characterization of Marquis de Lafayette from Hamilton. He speaks with a French accent, though most are unable to understand his language.
 Billy Eichner as Captain Bigman, McWinkle and Gluntz's boss.
 David Kaye, Nika Futterman, Keith Ferguson as Cronies, (Crony 3 is credited as "Big Green Crony").
 Rob Paulsen as Pool Shark
 David Kaye as Joaquin Furmano, a news reporter.

Season 2
 Patricia Clarkson as Pam-I-Am, Sam's long-lost mother and an international super spy working for Yookia to retrieve a dangerous substance known as the Moo-Lacka-Moo.
 Jose Andres as Sylvester, a super spy who works alongside Pam and Yookia. He lives with his wife Hester, five children named Lester, and their gerbil Allan.
 Rob Brydon as Philip Trousers, a vain but unintelligent super spy and Pam's arch-rival who is working for Zookia to retrieve the Moo-Lacka-Moo.
 Brydon also voices Snalfred, Pam's elderly and stiff butler.
 Gwendoline Christie as the lovely Ms. Marilyn Blouse, a beautiful and intelligent super spy who works with Trousers and Zookia.
 Rita Moreno as the Dookess of Zookia, the ruler over the nation of Zookia.
 Hector Elizondo as the Dooka of Yookia, the ruler over the nation of Yookia and Looka's father. Since this season is based on The Butter Battle Book, he's most likely based on character Chief Yookeroo.
 Darren Criss as Looka Ba-Dooka, the "Crown Dooka of Yookia, Chief Yookeroo, Order of the Unburnt Toast, Seventeenth of His Name", the Dooka of Yookia's son, and E.B.'s love interest.
 Kevin M. Richardson as Gobo, Chief of the Robababobrians.
 James Marsden as Bo, a maroonee trapped within the Keela-Kee Trapezoid, where he stays in one place to stay in his perfect age.
 Marques Ray as Guy Watcher, a Zookian hired by the Dookess to watch over Guy and his inventing.

Production

Development
On April 29, 2015, Netflix announced that it had given the production a series order consisting of thirteen episodes. At the same time, Deadline Hollywood reported that production on the series would take three years and was expected to be the most expensive animated program to make with each episode costing five to six million dollars. Production companies involved in the series include Warner Bros. Animation, A Very Good Production, A Stern Talking To and Gulfstream Pictures. Animation services for Season 1 were provided by Chromosphere Studio, Company 3 Animation (formerly Deluxe Animation Studios), Folimage, Snipple Animation Studios, Tonic DNA, and Yowza! Animation. In Season 2, they were provided by FuseFX, Snipple Animation Studios, Yowza! Animation, Digital eMation, Neon Creation, and Inspidea, with Chromosphere Studio animating the theme song, and Company 3 Animation doing post-production. The series was originally slated to premiere in the autumn of 2018 before receiving its autumn 2019 premiere window. On December 20, 2019, Netflix renewed the series for a second season with 10 episodes loosely based on The Butter Battle Book as revealed from the trailer on March 11, 2022. On October 8, 2022, Jarad Stern announced that the series will not be returning for a third season.

Casting
On February 19, 2019, the cast of the series was announced with Adam DeVine and Michael Douglas voicing the lead roles while Diane Keaton, Ilana Glazer, Eddie Izzard, Tracy Morgan, Daveed Diggs, John Turturro, Jeffrey Wright and Jillian Bell would have supporting roles.

Music

The music for the series is composed by David Newman, who previously composed the score for The Cat in the Hat (2003). It is Newman's first score for a television series, as well as his first score for an animated project since Ice Age (2002).

Episodes

Series overview

Season 1 (2019)

Season 2: The Second Serving (2022)

Reception

Critical response
On Rotten Tomatoes, the first season has an approval rating of 100% and an average rating of 8.5/10, based on 8 reviews. The website's critical consensus reads, "Critics love its animation, the way it plays with expectations. With goofy jokes and surprising wham, you may just love Green Eggs and Ham." Metacritic assigned the season a score of 89 out of 100, based on 4 reviews, signifying "universal acclaim".

Accolades

Home media
Season 1 was released on DVD on December 1, 2020, by Warner Bros. Home Entertainment.

References

External links

 
 

2010s American animated television series
2010s American children's comedy television series
2019 American television series debuts
2022 American television series endings
2020s American animated television series
2020s American children's comedy television series
2010s American drama television series
2020s American drama television series
American children's animated adventure television series
American children's animated comedy television series
American children's animated drama television series
American children's animated fantasy television series
American television shows based on children's books
English-language Netflix original programming
Netflix children's programming
Television duos
Television shows based on works by Dr. Seuss
Television series by A Very Good Production
Television series by Warner Bros. Animation
Television series created by Jared Stern
Prejudice in fiction
Crossover animated television series
Television shows scored by David Newman (composer)